The 1908 Ontario general election was the 12th general election held in the Province of Ontario, Canada.  It was held on June 8, 1908, to elect the 106 Members of the 12th Legislative Assembly of Ontario ("MLAs").

The Ontario Conservative Party, led by Sir James P. Whitney, was elected for a second term in government, increasing its majority in the Legislature significantly.

The Ontario Liberal Party, led by Alexander Grant MacKay, continued to lose seats.

Allan Studholme became the province's first Labour MLA as the result of a 1906 Hamilton East by-election. He was re-elected in the 1908 general election and would remain in the legislature until his death in 1919.

The four Toronto districts each elected two members in this election. Each seat was contested separately, with each voter in the district allowed to vote for a candidate in each contest.

Expansion of the Legislative Assembly
The number of electoral districts was increased from 97 to 102, under an Act passed in 1902, returning a total of 106 MLAs. The following electoral changes were made:

 Fort William and Lake of the Woods was split into Fort William and Kenora
 Port Arthur and Rainy River was split into Port Arthur and Rainy River
 Nipissing East was divided into Nipissing and Timiskaming
 Nipissing West was divided into Sudbury and Sturgeon Falls
 Cardwell was renamed Simcoe South, after the transfer of Albion and Bolton to Peel
 The three ridings of Huron County were reorganized:
 Huron South gained from Huron West the remainder of the Township of Goderich not previously included in it, in exchange for Seaforth
 Huron East and Huron West were reorganized into Huron North and Huron Centre respectively
 Ottawa was divided into Ottawa East and Ottawa West
 Toronto East, Toronto North, Toronto South and Toronto West now returned two MLAs each, elected separately in seats labelled A and B in each district.

Results

|-
! colspan=2 rowspan=2 | Political party
! rowspan=2 | Party leader
! colspan=5 | MPPs
! colspan=3 | Votes
|-
! Candidates
!1905
!Dissol.
!1908
!±
!#
!%
! ± (pp)

|style="text-align:left;"|James P. Whitney
|106
|69
|
|86
|17
|248,194
|55.10%
|1.73

|style="text-align:left;"|Alexander Grant MacKay
|90
|28
|
|19
|9
|177,719
|39.45%
|5.16

|style="text-align:left;"|
|8
|–
|
|1
|1
|7,842
|1.74%
|

|style="text-align:left;"|
|2
|1
|
|–
|1
|1,470
|0.33%
|0.87

|style="text-align:left;"|
|5
|–
|–
|–
|
|6,107
|1.36%
|1.34

|style="text-align:left;"|
|5
|–
|–
|–
|
|3,042
|0.68%
|0.66

|style="text-align:left;"|
|14
|–
|–
|–
|
|2,891
|0.64%
|0.35

|style="text-align:left;"|
|1
|–
|–
|–
|
|2,187
|0.49%
|

|style="text-align:left;"|
|1
|–
|–
|–
|
|1,017
|0.23%
|

|style="text-align:left;"|
|
|–
|–
|–
|
|colspan="3"|Did not campaign

|style="text-align:left;"|
|
|–
|–
|–
|
|colspan="3"|Did not campaign

|colspan="3"|
|
|colspan="5"|
|-style="background:#E9E9E9;"
|colspan="3" style="text-align:left;"|Total
|232
|98
|98
|106
|
|450,469
|100.00%
|
|-
|colspan="8" style="text-align:left;"|Blank and invalid ballots
|align="right"|6,765
|style="background:#E9E9E9;" colspan="2"|
|-style="background:#E9E9E9;"
|colspan="8" style="text-align:left;"|Registered voters / turnout
|681,564
|72.68%
|5.59
|}

Division and reorganization of ridings
The newly created ridings returned the following MLAs:

Seats that changed hands

Of the unaltered seats, there were 24 that changed allegiance in the election:

Liberal to Conservative
Brant South
Brockville
Essex South
Glengarry
Kent West
Kingston
Monck
Norfolk North
Peel
Peterborough East
Prescott
Prince Edward
Sault Ste. Marie
Wentworth North

 Independent-Liberal to Conservative
Hastings East

 Conservative to Liberal
Bruce South
Lambton East
Middlesex North
Oxford South
Perth South
Renfrew North
Stormont
Wellington West

 Conservative to Labour
Hamilton East

See also
Politics of Ontario
List of Ontario political parties
Premier of Ontario
Leader of the Opposition (Ontario)

References

Further reading
 

1908 elections in Canada
1908
1908 in Ontario
June 1908 events